Wausau Center was an enclosed shopping mall which opened in 1983 in downtown Wausau, Wisconsin. The last remaining anchor store was HOM Furniture, which still stands in a space that had previously been a Younkers. There were two vacant anchor stores that were once JCPenney and Sears. It was managed by Mid-America Real Estate Group.

History
The downtown area of Wausau was blighted by many vacant buildings in the late 1970s. A referendum passed in 1979 to allow Richard E. Jacobs' Jacobs Visconsi & Jacobs Group to build the mall. Approximately 67 buildings were demolished to make way for the mall, which opened on August 3, 1983. To commemorate the opening, a five-day celebration was held. Its original anchors were J. C. Penney, Sears, and Prange's (later Younkers). Walgreens, an original tenant, moved out in 2003 relocating to central Bridge Street.

In 2006, the mall owners began a renovation that included new seating areas and an improved mall entrance. Two years later, the food court was expanded, using space vacated that same year by a McDonald's.

The mall lost all three anchor stores between 2014 and 2018, with Younkers being the last of the three to close; in June 2019, HOM Furniture opened as the center's sole anchor store, having acquired the previously closed Younkers location.

Redevelopment
On February 4, 2020, the mall was sold to Wausau Opportunity Zone, Inc. (WOZ).  The acquisition does not include HOM Furniture or the two parking ramps.  It was planned for demolition sometime in 2021 to make way for a multimillion-dollar redevelopment, which will include residential and retail areas, office space, restaurants, entertainment, and green spaces. The mall closed permanently in April 2021. Demolition began on May 17, 2021. It took up to eight weeks for construction crews to remove the buildings and foundations, with HOM Furniture, the two parking ramps, and the JCPenney building remaining.  The JCPenney building will temporarily remain in place due to its location above the west parking ramp but is planned to be removed later.

References

External links
Wausau Center

Buildings and structures in Marathon County, Wisconsin
Shopping malls in Wisconsin
Defunct shopping malls in the United States
Demolished shopping malls in the United States
Shopping malls established in 1983
Wausau, Wisconsin
1983 establishments in Wisconsin
Shopping malls disestablished in 2021